Cathedral Basilica of St James the Apostle may refer to:
 Cathedral Basilica of St. James the Apostle, Tunja
 Cathedral Basilica of St. James the Apostle, Szczecin